Giovanni Piana (April 5, 1940 – February 24, 2019) was an Italian philosopher. He taught theoretical philosophy at the University of Milan from 1970 to 1999.

He was a disciple of Enzo Paci and wrote his dissertation on Husserl's unpublished works.

His philosophical position is characterised by the concept of phenomenology ("phenomenological structuralism") influenced by Husserl, Wittgenstein, and Bachelard. His thought was oriented towards the philosophy of knowledge, the philosophy of music, and the fields of perception and imagination.

Selected bibliography

Books
Philosophy of Music and its Aims. A Brief Account
Esistenza e storia negli inediti di Husserl, Lampugnani Nigri, Milano 1965. English translation by A. Roda, History and Existence in Husserl's Manuscripts, in "Telos", n. 13, 1972.
I problemi della fenomenologia, Mondadori, Milano 1966.
 Interpretazione del Tractatus di Wittgenstein, Il Saggiatore, Milano 1973 (2nd edition, Guerini e Associati, 1993).
Elementi di una dottrina dell'esperienza, Il Saggiatore, Milano, 1979.
La notte dei lampi. Quattro saggi sulla filosofia dell'immaginazione, Guerini e Associati, Milano,1988
Filosofia della musica, Guerini e Associati, Milano 1991 (3rd print in 1995, later released in CC). Translation to Portuguese (Brazil): A filosofia da Música, Edusc, Bauru 2001.
Mondrian e la musica, Milano, Guerini e Associati, 1995.
Teoria del sogno e dramma musicale. La metafisica della musica di Schopenhauer, Guerini e Associati, Milano 1997.
Numero e figura. Idee per una epistemologia della ripetizione. Cuem, Milano 1999.
 Alle origini della teoria della tonalità, 2005.

References

Internet archive
Giovanni Piana's Archive
English-language and Spanish-language entry point to Giovanni Piana's Archive

A selection of essays
Phenomenology as philosophical method , English translation from La fenomenologia come metodo filosofico, Introduzione al volume P. Spinicci, La visione e il linguaggio, Guerini e Associati, Milano 1992.
Immaginazione e poetica dello spazio, in Metafora Mimesi Morfogenesi Progetto, a cura di E. D'Alfonso e E. Franzini, Guerini e Associati, Milano 1991, pp. 93–100.
Considerazioni inattuali su T. W. Adorno, "Musica/Realtà", XIII, n. 39, (Dicembre 1992), pp. 27–53.
Figurazione e movimento nella problematica musicale del continuo, in Autori Vari, La percezione musicale, Guerini e Associati, Milano1993, pp. 11–36.
Fenomenologia dei materiali e campo delle decisioni. Riflessioni sull'arte del comporre, in Il canto di Seikilos, Scritti per Dino Formaggio nell'ottantesimo compleanno, Guerini e Associati, Milano 1995, pp. 45–55.
I compiti di una filosofia della musica brevemente esposti, De Musica 1997.
Elogio dell'immaginazione musicale, De Musica 1997.
La serie delle serie dodecafoniche e il triangolo di Sarngadeva, De Musica 2000.
Immagini per Schopenhauer (2001)

Translations
G. Lukács, Scritti di sociologia della letteratura (Milano, 1964)
H M. Enzensberger, Questioni di dettaglio ( Milano 1965)
G. Lukács, Storia e coscienza di classe (Milano, 1967)
E. Husserl, Ricerche logiche (Milano, 1968)
E. Husserl, Storia critica delle idee (Milano, 1989)

Papers quoting Piana's works
"Striking sentences in Giovanni Piana's Complete works"
"Giovanni Piana's "Conversazioni" and some recent controversies on Husserl's "Krisis""
"Giovanni Piana on musical meaning"
"Materials for a lexicographic analysis of Giovanni Piana's Complete works"
Bibliografia sull’estetica fenomenologica italiana 1900–1996
Cosmologia arcaica - Il triangolo di Sarngadeva
 Fenomenologia, coscienza del tempo e analisi musicale
Le variazioni antropologico-culturali dei significati simbolici dei colori
Zero, uno e gli «altri» numeri: Husserl e la tradizione empirista
Burnout e risorse in Musicoterapia
La crisi delle scienze fisiche fra Ottocento e Novecento: interpretazioni filosofiche
Aldo Scimone, Lezioni sui Fondamenti della Matematica

International journals special issues entirely devoted to Piana
 Phenomenological Reviews: Special issue in memory of Giovanni Piana
Eikasia: La fenomenología en Italia: Giovanni Piana

External links
Some indications about phenomenological structuralism are contained in the articles:
 "Phenomenology as philosophical method"
"The idea of a phenomenological structuralism"

20th-century Italian philosophers
21st-century Italian philosophers
Phenomenologists
1940 births
2019 deaths
People from Casale Monferrato